Leonard J. Fick (September 6, 1915 – February 4, 1990) was an American Roman Catholic priest, scholar and educator, college president, author in Ohio whose educational career spanned over fifty years. Fick devoted more than sixty years to the Pontifical College Josephinum and is considered by many to be its most prominent 20th century graduate, scholar, administrator and leader having occupied more positions of responsibility and leadership than anyone else during that time.  Father Fick, as he preferred to be called, at both Ohio Dominican University, the Josephinum and other institutions and churches, in both the classroom and from the pulpit, inspired generations of English students with his witty insights into the intricacies of the English language – into writing, poetry, literature and theatre and in insights into the life of Jesus Christ and his Church. Fick's critical and mentoring skills influenced a host of college-educated men and women who would go on to be priests, teachers, scholars and leaders in all walks of life.

Childhood
Leonard John Fick was born in Rich Fountain, Missouri, on September 6, 1915.  He was the oldest of the four sons of Herman and Mary Klebba Fick.  His family were German-speaking Catholics.   He graduated from Sacred Heart Elementary School in 1928.

Seminary education
Because of his German background, when young Leonard decided that he wanted to study to become a Catholic priest, it was only natural that he would consider a seminary founded by a German and that was still conducting some classes in German, although the institution had grown into a Pontifical College with a growing international emphasis.  This seminary was the Pontifical College Josephinum, a school founded by a German priest, Joseph Jessing; Jessing, raised in Germany, distinguished himself for bravery in fierce fighting for his country and eventually founded an orphanage in Ohio. Out of that orphanage grew a seminary; naturally, Fick was attracted to the Josephinum.

Beginning his high school studies in the fall of 1929, Fick arrived at the Josephinum to begin his high school seminary studies. He would distinguish himself all the way through his training as a gifted scholar.

Academic career
When he was ordained a Roman Catholic priest in 1941, the young priest was requested to stay on and join the teaching faculty at the Josephinum.  So as a student, teacher and administrator, Fick would be associated with the Josephinum for more than 61 years.  After graduating from the Seminary College, Fick went on to study English literature at St. Louis University, the University of California at Berkeley and the Ohio State University, where he completed his doctoral studies in 1951.

In 1958 Fick was appointed to the first level of Monsignorate by Rome. He would be appointed to the second level in 1967.  For twenty-one years, 1948–1969, Monsignor Fick also taught English at the College of St. Mary of the Springs, (now Ohio Dominican University). Fick was immensely popular among students, introducing them to literary classics, creative writing, research and drama.  A Monsignor Fick literary committee still meets at Ohio Dominican in his honor.

He was also a moderator of several literary clubs formed by graduates.  He addressed the seminary section at meetings of the National Catholic Education Association and helped other seminaries as a member of various teams that were sent to inspect the status of vocational education by the US Bishops' Committee on Priestly Formation.

Fick was named chairman of the English Department of the College in 1952. In 1958 he was named academic dean. He served as Vice Rector of the combined schools of the Josephinum Campus from 1969 until 1989.

Teaching
Because Fick had traveled much in his studies, he had the opportunity to meet well-known American authors including William Faulkner whom he met in a coffee house favored by the literary set in New York City. Sometimes, to illustrate a point in the classroom, Fick would make references to one of these encounters. When a student grew discouraged at the amounts of red ink expended on their term papers and essays, Fick would typically tell the student to persist in his or her efforts, reminding the student that "Knowledge maketh a bloody entrance," or similar quips. As editor of The Josephinum Review, he had a standing bet with his students to pay a dollar if anyone could find a single grammatical mistake. Never one to mince words, in the midst of an attack on an alleged grammatical "mistake" in his magazine, he told one student that he "had the tact of a wet noodle."

At times, vice rectors of the Josephinum (the apostolic delegate to the United States was the nominal rector) restricted students' access to "worldly literature." One such episode occurred after a visit of Bishop Joseph Mark McShea of Allentown, Pennsylvania, that led to a new vice rector, Ralph Thompson, and strict new rules, among them a "book policy" that limited what students could read. Beyond spiritual and classroom books, students had to have a permission slip signed by a professor for any book in their college rooms. One college student went to see Fick and asked him to sign a slip for John Dos Passos' trilogy "USA." With great sadness, Fick told him that while he was greatly pleased that this student wanted to read such a great work of American literature in three volumes, he didn't want his signature on a permission slip for such an author given the repressive atmosphere then in place at the Josephinum. Fick told the student to wait until summer, buy the book and read it during the vacation period.

In addition to his regular classes, when Fick could generate enough interest and time, he would offer a rare elective college course on the college level, World Literature. He limited the size of the class and required massive readings. Students recalled that they still referred to their notes for this class more than 40 years later for new things to read when they developed the literary version of the attitude Fick warned them against with the German phrase, "Ich hab schon alles gesehen."  (literally, "I have already all things seen"). As late as 2007, one former Fick student reported that next to his bedside table was Gösta Berling's Saga by Selma Lagerlöf, who in 1909 became the first woman and the first Swede to win the Nobel Prize for literature.

Accreditation efforts for the Josephinum schools
At the Josephinum Schools, Fick could see that the institution's future was tied to its stature academically both within Catholic as well as public educational accreditation institutions.  To that end, Fick undertook a long-term effort at attaining accreditation. As a direct result of his work, the Josephinum College was granted candidacy in 1972 in the North Central Association and full accreditation in 1976. This process took sixteen years of sustained and detailed effort including five self-studies and mountains of paperwork. When full accreditation was awarded it also included the Graduate School of Theology.

Author and writer
Msgr Fick authored numerous papers, articles and several books. In 1947 Fick edited the school publication formerly named The Josephinum Weekly, that had been in print since 1916, and renamed it The Josephinum Review. Fick was editor of this magazine for twenty years and authored the editorial column on the front page as well. Fick wrote The Light Beyond: A Study of Hawthorne's Theology, a book originally published in 1955 by The Newman Press and reprinted in 1975 by Norwood Editions. He also authored a book on the German stigmatic, Therese Neumann, What about Therese Neumann: A concise background for and analysis of the critical reception accorded Hilda C. Graef's the case of Therese Neumann, The Newman Press, 1951 ASIN, B0007H5KMO   In November 1988, Fick authored the definitive history of the Pontifical College Josephinum, The Jessing Legacy, 1888–1988: A Centennial History of the Pontifical College Josephinum.  through the Kairos Press.

Death in 1990
Fick died from complications of heart disease in 1990.  He was buried in the Josephinum Cemetery, on the grounds of the institution after a memorial service attended by over five hundred people including several bishops and over eighty priests.

Legacy
Ohio Dominican University (ODU), where he taught for over twenty years, continues to sponsor the Ohio Dominican Literary Committee that Fick started and hosts Ohio Dominican Literary events featuring guest speakers. ODU also started the Monsignor Leonard Fick Scholarship Fund in his honor for ODU students majoring in English. The school holds an annual Monsignor Leonard Fick Literary Brunch, which honors the late Ohio Dominican faculty member and raises funds for Literary events.

At his beloved Josephinum, prior to his death and in recognition of his notable service to the Josephinum, the auditorium in the College's 1958 recreation building was named in his honor.

See also
 Joseph Jessing
 Pontifical College Josephinum

References

External links 
Selected Writings of Leonard J. Fick
 2006-2007 PCJ Catalog

1915 births
1990 deaths
Pontifical College Josephinum faculty
American religious writers
American Roman Catholic religious writers
Ohio State University alumni
Writers from Columbus, Ohio
Pontifical College Josephinum alumni
University of California, Berkeley alumni
20th-century American non-fiction writers
Catholics from Ohio
20th-century American Roman Catholic priests